You Lay So Easy on My Mind is the thirty-fourth studio album by American pop singer Andy Williams, released in November 1974 by Columbia Records. The idea for this LP was mentioned in an interview with Williams in the November 3, 1973, issue of Billboard magazine that emphasized his desire to move away from recording albums of Easy Listening covers of hits by other artists, noting that he was "planning an album to be cut in Nashville with Columbia's high-flying country-pop producer, Billy Sherrill." The article coincided with the release of his first attempt to shift directions, Solitaire, which performed poorly. A return to the Easy Listening hits formula, The Way We Were, followed in the spring of 1974 but failed to even chart, so this next attempt to eschew soft rock songs leaned heavily on Country hits.

The album made its first appearance on the Billboard Top LP's & Tapes chart in the issue dated December 28, 1974, and remained there for four weeks, peaking at number 150. The album was released in the UK on February 14, 1975, and on March 1, 1976, the British Phonographic Industry awarded it with Silver certification for sales of 60,000 units.

The first song from the album to be released as a single by Williams was "Another Lonely Song", which entered Billboard magazine's list of the 40 most popular Easy Listening songs of the week in the US in the issue dated September 21, 1974, and stayed on the chart for eight weeks, peaking at number 29.  "Cry Softly" entered that same chart in the April 12, 1975, issue and reached number 20 over the course of six weeks, and the title track from the album entered the UK singles chart the following month, on May 31, for a seven-week stay that took the song to number 32.

You Lay So Easy on My Mind was released on compact disc for the first time as one of two albums on one CD by Collectables Records on February 19, 2002, the other album being Williams's Columbia release from the summer of 1975, The Other Side of Me.  Collectables included this CD in a box set entitled Classic Album Collection, Vol. 2, which contains 15 of his studio albums and two compilations and was released on November 29, 2002. It was also released as one of two albums on one CD by Sony Music Distribution on June 21, 2004, paired this time with Williams's album from 1980, Let's Love While We Can.

Reception

Billboard gave the album a positive review, noting that "Williams has always tried to adapt to the times, and his going Nashville is another step in that direction."

Track listing

Side one
 "You Lay So Easy on My Mind" (Charles W. Fields, Bobby G. Rice, Donald L. Riis) - 2:41
 "I Love You So Much It Hurts" (Floyd Tillman) - 2:33
 "I Honestly Love You" (Peter Allen, Jeff Barry) - 3:33
 "A Mi Esposa con Amor (To My Wife with Love)" (Sonny James, Craig Smith) - 3:05
 "Again" (Joe Allen) - 2:47

Side two
 "Another Lonely Song" (Billy Sherrill, Norris Wilson, Tammy Wynette) - 2:56
 "I'll Have to Say I Love You in a Song" (Jim Croce) - 2:25
 "I Love My Friend" (Sherrill, Wilson) - 2:33
 "My Elusive Dreams" (Curly Putman, Sherrill) - 3:36
 "Cry Softly" (Buddy Killen, Sherrill, Glenn Sutton) - 3:14

Recording dates
From the liner notes for the 2002 CD:
June 18–19, 1974 – "A Mi Esposa con Amor (To My Wife with Love)", "Another Lonely Song", "Cry Softly", "You Lay So Easy on My Mind"
September 18–19, 1974 – "Again", "I Honestly Love You", "I Love My Friend", "I Love You So Much It Hurts", "I'll Have to Say I Love You in a Song", "My Elusive Dreams"

Song information

Bobby G. Rice made it to number three on the Country singles chart in Billboard magazine with "You Lay So Easy on My Mind". The highest charting version of "I Love You So Much It Hurts" was the recording by Jimmy Wakely that went to number one on the magazine's list of Most Played Juke Box Folk Records. Olivia Newton-John reached the top spot on the magazine's pop and Easy Listening charts with "I Honestly Love You", and "A Mi Esposa con Amor (To My Wife with Love)" by Sonny James got as high as number four on the Country singles chart.

Tammy Wynette had number one Country hits with "Another Lonely Song" and "My Elusive Dreams", the latter being a duet with David Houston. Jim Croce's "I'll Have to Say I Love You in a Song" went to number one Easy Listening and number 9 pop. "I Love My Friend" by Charlie Rich made it to the top spot on both the Country and Easy Listening charts, and Nancy Ames made it to number 18 Easy Listening and number 95 pop with "Cry Softly".

Personnel
From the liner notes for the original album:

Andy Williams - vocals
Billy Sherrill - producer
Bill McElhiney - string arrangements ("Another Lonely Song", "Cry Softly", "A Mi Esposa con Amor" and " You Lay So Easy on My Mind")
Bergen White - string arrangements ("I'll Have To Say I Love You in a Song", "I Honestly Love You", "I Love You So Much It Hurts", "My Elusive Dreams", "Again" and "I Love My Friend")
The Nashville Edition - background vocals
Lou Bradley - engineer
Ron Reynolds - engineer
Keats Tyler - photography
John Brogna - design

References

Bibliography

1974 albums
Andy Williams albums
Albums produced by Billy Sherrill
Columbia Records albums